

National chains
Casa Ley, associate of Safeway Inc.Controladora Comercial Mexicana operates:
Bodega Comercial Mexicana
City Market
Fresko
MEGA
SumesaCostco 50–50 joint venture with Comercial MexicanaGrupo ChedrauiH-E-B Mexico - wholly owned subsidiary of the H.E.Butt Grocery Company, San Antonio, TexasOrganización Soriana operates:
City Club
Soriana
Soriana MercadoWal-Mart de México''' operates:
Bodega Aurrerá
Sam's Club
Superama
Wal-Mart

Regional chains
  Aladino's (Coahuila, Jalisco, Nuevo León, Querétaro, State of México)
  Alsuper (Chihuahua, Coahuila, Durango, Zacatecas)
  Arteli (Tamaulipas, Veracruz, San Luis Potosi, Hidalgo)
  Calimax (Baja California, Sonora)
  El Asturiano (Querétaro)
  GranD (Tamaulipas)
  La Bodega Herlomex (Baja California)
  La Gran Bodega (Oaxaca, Puebla, Tlaxcala)
  Marinero (Durango)
  Nena's (Baja California, Sonora)
  S-Mart (Chihuahua, Nuevo León, Tamaulipas)
  Welton (Baja California, Sonora)

Defunct chains
 France Auchan – acquired by Comercial Mexicana
 France Carrefour – acquired by Chedraui and Soriana
 Mexico Aurrerá – acquired by and rebranded to Wal-Mart
 Germany Plus - closed in 20 November 2010, later the stores acquired by Carrefour in 21 November 2010
 Mexico Blanco – acquired by Gigante which at once, acquired by Soriana in 2007
 Mexico Gigante – acquired by Soriana
 Mexico Comercial Mexicana

See also
 List of supermarket chains

Mexico
Supermarket chains